The 1933 Delaware State Hornets football team represented Delaware State University in the 1933 college football season as an independent. Delaware State had a 4–4 record. Their coach was Edward Jackson.

Schedule

References

Delaware State
Delaware State Hornets football seasons
Delaware State Hornets football